Ceratophyllus ciliatus is a species of flea in the family Ceratophyllidae. It was described by Baker in 1904.

References 

Ceratophyllidae
Insects described in 1904